Barnes Group Inc. (NYSE:B) is a global industrial and aerospace manufacturer and service provider.

It was founded in 1857 by the great-grandfather of Wallace Barnes, who was appointed president in 1964, the same year in which the company added the Bowman Distribution Group to its Associated Spring enterprise. Two decades later, it became involved in the aerospace industry. As of 1991, the Barnes family owned a third of the company's stock; in that year, William R. Fenoglio - the first non-family member to hold the position of chief executive - took over from Barnes, leaving no Barnes' in the executive suite, though some remained on the board.

References

External links
 

Companies listed on the New York Stock Exchange
Aerospace companies of the United States
Manufacturing companies based in Connecticut
Companies based in Hartford County, Connecticut